Edward, Ed, Eddie or Teddy Davis may refer to:

In sports
 Edward Davis or Mickey Davis (born 1950), American basketball player
 Eddie Davis (boxer) (born 1951), light heavyweight boxer
 Eddie Davis (Canadian football) (born 1973), football player
 Ed Davis (basketball) (born 1989), American player
 Eddie Davis (cricketer) (1922–2011), English cricketer
 Peanuts Davis (Edward A. Davis, 1917–1974), American baseball player
 Teddy Davis (1923–1966), boxer
 T. Edward Davis (1898–1970), American football, basketball, and baseball coach

In politics and government
 Edward S. Davis (1808–1887), Massachusetts politician
 Edward M. Davis (1916–2006), California State Senator and LAPD police chief
 Edward B. Davis (1933–2010), American judge
 Ed Davis (police commissioner) (born 1956), Commissioner of the Boston Police Department
 Ed Davis (politician) (1890–1956), Washington politician
 Edward Davis (car dealer) (1911–1999), American car dealer
 Admiral Edward H.M. Davis (1846–1929), Royal Navy officer

In entertainment
 Eddie "Lockjaw" Davis (1922–1986), jazz tenor saxophonist
 Eddie Davis (producer) (1926–1994), record producer and record label owner
 Eddie Davis (director) (1903–?), American director and screenwriter
 Eddy Davis (1940–2020), American jazz musician
 Teddy Davis, singer and songwriter on Labour of Love II
 Edward Thomson Davis (1833–1867), English genre painter
 Edward Le Davis, Welsh engraver and art dealer

Other
 Edward Davis (buccaneer) (fl. c. 1680–1688), English buccaneer
 Edward Davis (sculptor) (1813–1878) English sculptor
 Edward Davis (bushranger) (1816–1841), Australian convict turned bushranger
 Edward H. Davis (1862–1951), field collector for the Museum of the American Indian in New York
 Edward Wilson Davis (1888–1973), American engineer and inventor
 Edward F. C. Davis (1847–1895), American mechanical engineer
 Ed Davis (criminal) (1900–1938), American burglar, bank robber and outlaw
 Ed Davis (Royal Marines officer) (born 1963), Governor of Gibraltar

See also
 Edwards Davis (1867–1936), American actor and former minister
 Ted Davis (disambiguation)
 Edward Davies (disambiguation)